Poncie Ponce (born Ponciano Tabac Ponce; April 10, 1933 – July 19, 2013) was an American actor, musician and stand-up comedian.  Born in Maui, Hawaii, he moved to Los Angeles, where from 1959–1963 he played the role of cab driver Kazuo Kim in the Warner Bros. detective series Hawaiian Eye, on the ABC television network. 
In 1961, Ponce was at the forefront of a growing national interest in martial arts when he opened a karate studio in North Hollywood.

Early life

Ponciano Tabac Ponce was born one of seven children in Maui, Hawaii on April 10, 1933 to Maria and Alberto Hernandez.  He attended Honokaa High School in Honokaa, Hawaii, and pursued a career as a welder at Hawaii Vocational School.  However, he was called to serve his country for two years in the United States Army.  Deployed to Germany in 1953, Ponce honed his artistic talents in Munich's clubs.  The entertainment bug bit him, and upon return to civilian life, Ponce made the rounds of Hawaii's local talent contests and television and radio stations.  Encouraged by Hawaii tourist audiences, Ponce decided to try his luck in Los Angeles.

Discovery and stardom

Los Angeles automobile dealer Bob Yeakel broadcast an 18-hour weekly amateur talent show called Rocket to Stardom from his Wilshire Boulevard showroom.  The broadcast was split over two local stations, KHJ-TV Channel 9 and KTTV-TV Channel 11.Ponce made a series of appearances on the local show in the late 1950s and was soon working at Ben Blue's  Santa Monica night club.  Warner Bros. honchos William T. Orr and Hugh Benson happened to catch his act at Ben Blue's and thought he might be a good fit for their new production Hawaiian Eye. There was one stipulation to the contract, that he change his name to Poncie Ponce. Jack L. Warner changed his name to Ponce.

Ponce came to national attention in 1959 as the wise-cracking cab driver Kazuo Kim on the Warner Bros. detective series Hawaiian Eye,  which ran for four years on ABC. Kazuo Kim was known for his trademark straw hat and ubiquitous ukulele, as a sometimes informant for the detectives, or as he idly plucked the uke while leaning against his cab waiting for a fare.  The show's intro showed Kazuo Kim floating in the ocean on an inner tube, wearing the hat and plucking his uke.

According to Don Ho, in the days when Don was still just a local entertainer in Waikiki,  Ponce and the Hawaiian Eye cast and crew used to come to his show every night.   The Hawaiian Eye patronage became a big draw for Don and the small club, as customers would line up just to be able to be with the television celebrities.

Films and club dates

The show led to parts in a handful of films, most notably as part of a stock car racing pit crew on Elvis Presley's team in the 1968 Speedway.

Hawaiian Eye provided opportunities for Ponce, that continued after the show ended, to perform and make personal appearances around the globe.  In 1963, Ponce joined the promotional staff of television station HSV 7 in Melbourne, Australia.  Beginning December 29, 1964, Ponce began a four-week engagement at the Checkers Club in Sydney, Australia.   In February 1965, Ponce played the Getsusekai club in Tokyo.  June 9–16, 1965, Ponce was appearing on radio and television in Buenos Aires.  Ponce, who lived in California, sometimes entertained at events in Las Vegas.
Long after the show ended, Ponce was booked at nostalgia events.

Recordings
The television show also opened opportunities for Ponce to record for Warner Bros. Records.  In 1961, Warner Bros. released Ponce's single Ten Cent Perfume / No Huhu. Billboard magazine gave the single a three-star rating for "Moderate sales potential".  The magazine explained its three-star rating as, "...these frequently will be of interest for disk jockey programming."  An interesting three-star rating in the same issue was given to the Chad Mitchell Trio's single release Lizzie Borden.  In 1962, Warner Bros released the album Poncie Ponce Sings.  Billboard gave the album a four-star "Strong Sales Potential" rating,  saying, "He does his best work on novelties," and giving the album the same ranking as new albums from artists Damita Jo, Dinah Washington and Lee Dorsey.

Later years
In 2000, Ponce underwent heart surgery.  That same year, he made an appearance at a Pacific Pioneer Broadcasters luncheon honoring his friend and former co-star Connie Stevens, where the two old friends sang the Hawaiian Wedding Song.  In 2006, Ponce, who was home on Maui for a high school reunion, gave locals a thrill by performing an impromptu jam with  stand-up comic Augie T.   After retiring, Ponce spent time with his wife of over five decades and his grandchildren. He died on July 19, 2013 at 80.

Discography
Hawaiian Eye (soundtrack) (1960) Warner Bros. 1355, (2006) re-released, Collectibles 7779
Ten Cent Perfume / No Huhu (1961) Warner Bros. single 5244
Poncie Ponce Sings (1962) Warner Bros. W5-1453

Filmography
Portrait of a Mobster (1961)
Speedway  (1968)
The World's Greatest Lover (1977)
G.I. Joe: The Movie  (1987)

Television appearances

77 Sunset Strip (1959–1960)
The Gallant Men (1963)
Hawaiian Eye  (1959–1963)
The Red Skelton Hour (1953–1963)
The Woody Woodbury Show (1968)
Family Feud  (1983)
Michael Nesmith in Television Parts  (1985)
Doctor Duck's Super Secret All-Purpose Sauce  (1986)

References

Further reading

External links
 

1933 births
2013 deaths
American male television actors
Musicians from Hawaii
Male actors from Hawaii
People from Maui
American male actors of Filipino descent
Hawaiian ukulele players
Bongo players
American trombonists
Male trombonists
Warner Bros. contract players